Silver City is a 2013 Christmas album recorded by experimental Christian rock band Falling Up. It was released digitally on December 6, 2013, and contained 11 tracks. It is the first Christmas-related album that Falling Up has released. Although the band labeled it as an "extended play," at 11 tracks, it exceeds both Billboard'''s and the RIAA's definition for an EP, which is capped at six and five maximum tracks, respectively. The iTunes Store and Amazon.com versions did not include the opening track, "Intro/Jingle Bells".

Due to the album's release being too close to Christmas to press physical copies and mail them in time, Falling Up only released the album digitally, stating that they would most likely remaster the album, add a few songs and release physical copies for Christmas 2014.

After the initial release of Silver City, the album was made available through "Groupees" for a $1.00 minimum donation in support of the Typhoon Haiyan victims, with 100% of the proceeds going to Action Against Hunger's relief fund.

Reception
The Silver City'' EP generally received very positive reviews, with many mentioning its uniqueness as a Christmas album. Jesus Freak Hideout's David Craft noted that the EP is "well-worth many spins this holiday season, and will surely provide [listeners] with a fresh enjoyment of even the most traditional carols."

Track listing
The album contained eleven basic tracks:

References

2013 Christmas albums
Christmas albums by American artists
Falling Up (band) albums
Alternative rock Christmas albums